Flight 114 may refer to the following accidents involving commercial airliners:
 Bonanza Air Lines Flight 114, a Fairchild Hiller FH-227 that crashed near Sloan, Nevada on 15 November 1964, killing all 29 people on board
 Libyan Arab Airlines Flight 114, a Boeing 727 that was shot down by the Israeli air force over the then-occupied Sinai peninsula on 21 February 1973, killing 108 out of the 113 people on board
 Nightexpress Flight 114, at Beechcraft Model 99 that crashed on 30 June 1999 near Liège, Belgium, resulting in the death of the two pilots on board
 Thai Airways International Flight 114, a Boeing 737-400 that was destroyed in a fuel tank explosion at Bangkok Airport prior to the boarding of passengers on 3 March 2001
Additionally, Flight 114 might refer to STS-114, the first Space Shuttle mission following the Columbia Disaster; it was launched on 26 July 2005 and successfully returned on 9 August.

0114